Rube Lutzke (November 17, 1897 – March 6, 1938) was an American professional baseball player. He played from 1923 to 1927 with the Cleveland Indians. He primarily played third base.

According to the Saturday May 4, 1920 Montreal Standard (p. 30) Lutzke is notable for betting that he could slide down a rope from a fifth floor room of the team's hotel. He won the bet, but burnt his hands on the rope, making him temporarily unable to play. The team management sent him to the minor leagues.

In 572 games over five seasons, Lutzke posted a .249 batting average (468-for-1876) with 216 runs, 4 home runs, 222 RBI and 179 bases on balls. He finished his career with a .947 fielding percentage.

References 

1897 births
1938 deaths
Cleveland Indians players
Baseball players from Milwaukee
Milwaukee Red Sox players